Sardang-e Komiz (also Romanized as Sardang-e Komīz; also known as Komīz and Kumiz) is a village in Abnama Rural District, in the Central District of Rudan County, Hormozgan Province, Iran. At the 2006 census, its population was 1,291, in 272 families.

References 

Populated places in Rudan County